Bengt Rasmus Mikael Troedsson, (born 9 January 1964) is a Swedish actor, writer and journalist. He has worked for SVT, TV4, and Sveriges Radio. As an actor he is best known for his role as Bellan Roos in Vår tid är nu which is broadcast on SVT, he has also had roles in The Bridge, Beyond and Mirakel. In 2020, he presented an episode of Sommar i P1 on Sveriges Radio where he told about his life and career.

Filmography
1995 – Mördande intelligens
1999 – Offer och gärningsmän (TV-series)
1999 – Dödsklockan
2000 – Soldater i månsken (TV-series)
2004 – Graven (TV-series)
2005 – Lasermannen (TV-series)
2006 – Beck – Skarpt läge
2006 – Inga tårar
2007 – Upp till kamp (TV-series)
2008 – Andra avenyn (TV-series)
2009 – De halvt dolda (TV-series)
2010 – Wallander – Vålnaden
2010 – För kärleken
2010 – Starke man (TV-series)
2010 – Himlen är oskyldigt blå
2010 – Svinalängorna
2011 – Gränsen
2011 – Soffan
2011 – Maria Wern - Svart fjäril
2011 – The Bridge (TV-series)
2011 – Anno 1790 (TV-series)
2012 – Studio Sex
2012 – Call Girl
2014 – Gentlemen
2015 – John Hron
2017–2019 – Vår tid är nu (TV-series)
2020 – Mirakel (TV-series)

Bibliography
Troedsson, Rasmus; Hultgren Mats (1987). Det stinker i salongen. 
Troedsson, Rasmus; Pohl Kristian (1988). Jag skall frälsa världen.

References

External links 

Living people
1964 births
Swedish male film actors
Swedish male television actors